The Scoop is a mystery adventure game published by Telarium, a subsidiary of Spinnaker Software, in 1986 for Apple II and rereleased by Spinnaker Software in 1989 for DOS. The plot is based on the collaborative detective novel of the same name, written in 1931 by Agatha Christie, Dorothy L. Sayers, E. C. Bentley, Anthony Berkeley, Freeman Wills Crofts, and Clemence Dane.

Gameplay
The player impersonates a journalist working for the down-on-its-luck newspaper The Daily Courier. He is sent to investigate two murders which may, or may not, be connected. The player has five days to solve the crimes and provide enough evidence to lead to an arrest, otherwise The Daily Courier will go out of business.

NPCs in the game have a set routine and go about their business in different locations, meaning the player will sometimes have to follow them and eavesdrop on their conversations in order to collect clues.

Because of the short time limit to solve the crimes, the player will often have to restart the game entirely in order to get everything done on time.

References

External links
 The Scoop at Museum of Computer Adventure Game History
 The Scoop at Adventureland

1986 video games
Adventure games
Apple II games
Detective video games
DOS games
Single-player video games
Telarium games
Video games based on novels
Video games based on works by Agatha Christie
Video games developed in the United States